New England Institute of Technology (New England Tech or NEIT) is a private university with its main campus in East Greenwich, Rhode Island.  It was established in 1940 and Richard I. Gouse has been the president since 1971.

Campuses
New England Tech's main campus is located on One New England Tech Blvd, East Greenwich with two smaller campuses located in Warwick.

East Greenwich Campus

The East Greenwich Campus is the main campus for all administrative, residence, athletics, and student services. The campus's centerpiece is a newly renovated 265,000-square-foot facility dedicated to classrooms, technical labs, medical suites for training simulations, and administrative services. The interior features technical labs and an open atrium with multi-tiered waterfall. A 400-bed residence hall is also located on the East Greenwich campus.

The building had been intended to serve as headquarters for the Eckerd Corporation. The site was purchased in 2007 still unfinished, and extensively customized for New England Tech. It opened to students in summer 2011; a major expansion begun in 2014 added dormitories and new instructional space.

Julian B. Gouse Campus
The Julian B. Gouse Campus is a 57,000-square-foot facility containing classroom and laboratory space located on Post Road in Warwick, Rhode Island.

Access Road campus
The Access Road Campus consists of four buildings, including an automotive technician school which opened in 2005.

Academics
The school is accredited by the New England Association of Schools and Colleges. It offers degrees in various technical areas, including plumbing and heating ventilation, architectural design, nursing, occupational therapy, veterinary technology, business management, criminal justice and software engineering, shipbuilding and advanced manufacturing.

National Alternative Fuels Training Consortium 

The National Alternative Fuels Training Consortium (or NAFTC) has a Training Center located at NEIT.

References

External links

 

Private universities and colleges in Rhode Island
Education in Kent County, Rhode Island
Buildings and structures in East Greenwich, Rhode Island
Educational institutions established in 1940
1940 establishments in Rhode Island